Irene Kaggwa Sewankambo (née Irene Kaggwa), is a Ugandan electrical engineer and corporate executive, who serves as the Acting Executive Director of the Uganda Communications Commission (UCC) since 10 February 2020.

Background and education
Irene was born in Uganda and she attended Kitante Primary School in Kampala, Uganda. She studied at Mount Saint Mary's College Namagunga for her middle and high school education. She graduated with a High School Diploma in Mathematics, Physics and Chemistry. She was then admitted to Makerere University to study electrical engineering.

She holds a Bachelor of Science in Electrical Engineering degree, obtained from Makerere University, Uganda's oldest and largest public university. Her second degree, a Master of Science in Communications Systems and Signal Processing, was awarded by the University of Bristol. She also holds a  Master of Science in Economic Management and Policy, obtained from the University of Strathclyde.

Career
Immediately before her present appointment, Engineer Sewankambo served as the Director for Engineering and Communication Infrastructure at the Uganda Communications Commission. Before that, she was the head of research and development unit at UCC as well as coordinator in the office of the executive director.

In February 2020, Judith Nabakooba, the Cabinet Minister of Information and Communications Technology appointed Irene Sewankambo as the Acting Executive Director, pending the appointment of a substantive executive director. She replaced Engineer Godfrey Mutabazi, whose two consecutive five-year contracts had expired.

Personal details
Irene Kaggwa Sewankambo is a married woman with children.

See also
 Communications in Uganda

References

External links
  Website of the Uganda Communications Commission

Year of birth missing (living people)
Living people
Ganda people
Ugandan electrical engineers
Makerere University alumni
Alumni of the University of Bristol
Ugandan women engineers
Alumni of the University of Strathclyde
21st-century women engineers
People educated at Mount Saint Mary's College Namagunga
People from Central Region, Uganda
Ugandan women chief executives
21st-century Ugandan businesswomen
21st-century Ugandan businesspeople